Giovanni Agostino Campanile (died 4 July 1594) was a Roman Catholic prelate who served as Bishop of Minori (1567–1594).

Biography
On 8 August 1567, Giovanni Agostino Campanile was appointed during the papacy of Pope Pius V as Bishop of Minori. On 31 August 1567, he was consecrated bishop by Giulio Antonio Santorio, Archbishop of Santa Severina, with Thomas Goldwell, Bishop of Saint Asaph, and Egidio Valenti, Bishop of Nepi e Sutri, serving as co-consecrators. He served as Bishop of Minori until his death on 4 July 1594.

Episcopal succession
While bishop, he was the principal co-consecrator of:
Serafino Fortibraccia, Bishop of Nemosia (1569), and 
Francesco D'Afflitto, Bishop of Scala (1583)

See also 
Catholic Church in Italy

References

External links and additional sources
 (for Chronology of Bishops) 
 (for Chronology of Bishops) 

16th-century Italian Roman Catholic bishops
Bishops appointed by Pope Pius V
1594 deaths